The Aberfeldy River is a perennial river of the West Gippsland catchment, located in the Alpine region of the Australian state of Victoria.

Features and location
Formed by the confluence of the North and South branches of the river, the Aberfeldy River rises in a state forestry area below Mount Selma on part of the Great Dividing Range. The river descends  over its  course.

Etymology
In the Aboriginal Brataualung language the river is named Nambruc, meaning "plenty of black opossums".

See also

Rivers of Victoria

References

External links
 
 

West Gippsland catchment
Rivers of Gippsland (region)
Victorian Alps